Skurbuchan, also spelled Skitchan, is the headquarters of the eponymous block in the Leh district of Ladakh, India. It is located in the Khalsi tehsil. It is located 125km west of Leh city. People here are devoted to Tibetan Buddhism, particualy the Drikung Kagyu lineage.

Demographics 
According to the 2011 census of India, Skur Buchan has 299 households. The effective literacy rate (i.e. the literacy rate of population excluding children aged 6 and below) is 66.13%.

References

Villages in Khalsi tehsil